A Picasso is a two-character stage play based Jeffrey Hatcher.  Originally commissioned by Philip Langner and the Theatre Guild.  A Picasso received its world premier by The Philadelphia Theatre Company at Plays and Players Theater, in Philadelphia, opening on May 31, 2003.

In occupied Paris, 1941, Pablo Picasso has been summoned from his favorite cafe and taken to a storage vault for an interrogation by Miss Fischer, a "cultural attache" from Berlin.  She has been ordered to authenticate three Picasso paintings recently "confiscated" by the Nazis from their Jewish owners.  The Nazi Ministry of Propaganda has planned an "exhibition" to burn "degenerate art."  Picasso engages Fischer in a desperate negotiation to save his work while the pair discuss art, politics, sex, and truth.

Productions 
Directed by John Tillinger.  The play was presented by The Philadelphia Theatre Company, Philadelphia.
Pablo Picasso .... Jeffrey DeMunn
Miss Fischer .... Lisa Banes

Directed by John Tillinger.  The play was presented by Coconut Grove Playhosue in Miami, Florida.
Pablo Picasso .... Peter Michael Goetz
Miss Fischer .... Lucie Arnaz

Directed by John Tillinger. The play was presented by the Manhattan Theatre Club, New York City.
Pablo Picasso .... Dennis Boutsikaris
Miss Fischer .... Jill Eikenberry

Divadlo Ungelt 
Directed by Jiří Svoboda. The play was presented by the Ungelt Theatre in Prague. The play was won a prize Thalia for both an actor Milan Kňažko (nominated) and Vilma Cibulková (won).
Pablo Picasso .... Milan Kňažko
Miss Fischer .... Vilma Cibulková

References

External links 
Critique in Czechoslovak Film Database
Ungelt Theatre
Geffen Playhouse, Los Angeles

American plays
Biographical plays about painters
2003 plays
Cultural depictions of Pablo Picasso
Plays based on real people
Plays set in the 1940s